Rafael Vela Rodrigues (born 27 January 2002) is a Portuguese professional footballer who plays as a left-back for Benfica B.

International career
Rodrigues has represented Portugal at youth international level.

Career statistics

Club

Notes

Honours
Benfica
 UEFA Youth League: 2021–22
Under-20 Intercontinental Cup: 2022

References

2002 births
Living people
People from Oliveira do Bairro
Portuguese footballers
Portugal youth international footballers
Association football defenders
Liga Portugal 2 players
S.L. Benfica B players
Sportspeople from Aveiro District